Edgar Woolard may refer to:

 Edgar S. Woolard Jr. (born 1934), American businessman
 Edgar W. Woolard (1899–1978), American meteorologist, mathematician and planetary scientist